The 2017 Buffalo mayoral election was held on November 7, 2017. Incumbent three-term Democratic mayor Byron Brown won re-election to a fourth term.

Background 

The 2017 Buffalo mayoral race was held to elect the mayor of Buffalo, New York.  The incumbent, Byron Brown, successfully ran for re-election against city comptroller Mark J. F. Schroeder and Erie County legislator Betty Jean Grant.  A primary took place on September 12, 2017.  Brown won the primary with Schroeder as the runner up and Grant coming in third.  Schroeder won the Reform Party primary and was on that line for the general election.

Candidates

Democratic

 Byron Brown, incumbent Mayor
 Mark J. F. Schroeder, City Comptroller of Buffalo
 Betty Jean Grant, Erie County Legislator

Green

 Terrence Robinson, founding member of Preservation Buffalo Niagara, member of the Buffalo Preservation Board

Conservative

Anita Howard, attorney

Reform

Mark J. F. Schroeder, City Comptroller of Buffalo

Results

References 

Buffalo
Buffalo
2017
Buffalo